A headpiece is an object worn on the head for decoration or protection.

Headpiece may refer to:

A typically thin metallic crown, headband, or tiara worn around the forehead. Commonly worn by ancient rulers, such as Cleopatra, headpieces usually carry some emblem of religious or political significance. 
A beaded or woven meshwork, often fringed, and worn covering the hair – fascinator.
The part of a dance or theatrical costume that is worn on the head.

Headgear